The Parsis are a Zoroastrian community of South Asia.

Parsi or Parsis may also refer to:

Places 
Parsi, Iran, a village in Mazandaran Province, Iran
Parsi, Bihar, a village in India
Pärsi, village in Viljandi County in southern Estonia

Other uses 
 Parsi (Tati), Iranian ethnic group from the Caucasus (Tat people)
Parsi language, the name of several languages
Proposed unit of currency to replace the Iranian rial
Socialist Party of Indonesia (Parsi)

People with the name 
Albert Parsis (1890-1980), French footballer
Arsham Parsi (b. 1981), Iranian LGBT Human Rights activist
Héctor Campos Parsi, Puerto Rican composer
Trita Parsi, Iranian policy analyst

See also
 Farsi (disambiguation)
 Persian (disambiguation)
 Persia (disambiguation)
 Iranian (disambiguation)